Le Bignon-Mirabeau is a commune in the Loiret department in the Centre-Val de Loire region of France.

Population

Comte de Mirabeau

The commune was the birthplace of one of the most celebrated figures of the French Revolution, the comte de Mirabeau. The future orator and statesman was born in the Chateau de Bignon on 4 April 1749.

After Mirabeau's death, the commune's original name was amended to Le Bignon-Mirabeau by a resolution of the Municipal Council on 1 November 1792. The name eventually passed out of favor but was officially and permanently restored in the 1880s. A bronze statue of Mirabeau was erected in the commune to commemorate the restoration of the name.

See also
Communes of the Loiret department

References

Communes of Loiret